The lesser flying fox or Sanborn's flying fox (Pteropus mahaganus) is a species of flying fox in the family Pteropodidae. It is found in Papua New Guinea and the Solomon Islands.  The species is poorly known, but is believed to inhabit coastal lowlands, including tropical rainforest.  Although the species has been found plantations, the habitat of the species is fragmented by increasing agriculture and logging.

Sources

Pteropus
Bats of Oceania
Mammals of Papua New Guinea
Mammals of the Solomon Islands
Mammals described in 1931
Taxonomy articles created by Polbot
Taxa named by Colin Campbell Sanborn